Alibi is the third studio album by Dutch hard rock band Vandenberg, released on 29 August 1985 by Atco Records. This was Vandenberg's final studio album for 35 years until their reunion in 2020.

Background 
It was recorded in the Netherlands for the first time on a Vandenberg album. Following the previous album, Adrian Vandenberg painted cover art, and in 2007, 75 artwork graphs of this work were released in commemoration of Adrian's individual painting exhibition, Stuck Between Rock and an Art Place, in Antwerp.

Bert Heerink has since emphasized vocals in Alibi regarding the sound production of this work. The two early albums say that for me, the production of the opening of the song seems to be emphasized.

Cover art 
The cover art featured Mexican Maya civilization and crocodiles from the ground in the red sunset. Like its predecessor, its artwork was created by guitarist Adrian Vandenberg himself.

Track listing 
Music and lyrics by Adrian Vandenberg

Side one
 "All the Way" – 3:50
 "Pedal to the Metal" – 4:31
 "Once in a Lifetime" – 3:54
 "Voodoo" – 3:21
 "Dressed to Kill" – 3:36

Side two
"Fighting Against the World" – 4:17
 "How Long" – 4:12
 "Prelude Mortale" – 0:38
 "Alibi" – 4:23
 "Kamikaze" – 5:03

Personnel

Band members 
 Bert Heerink – lead vocals, harmony vocals
 Adrian Vandenberg – guitars, synthesizers, harmony vocals, cover painting
 Dick Kemper – bass guitar, bass pedals, harmony vocals
 Jos Zoomer – drums, percussion

Additional musicians 
 Peter Schön – keyboards
 Piet Souer, Omar Dupree – background vocals

Production 
 Jaap Eggermont – producer, engineer, remix on "Once in a Lifetime"
 John Smit – engineer
 Stephen Benben – remix on "Once in a Lifetime"
 Dan Nash – remix assistant on "Once in a Lifetime"
 Bob Ludwig – mastering at Masterdisk, New York

References

External links 
 

Vandenberg (band) albums
1985 albums
Atco Records albums